Denver Christian School is a private college preparatory Christian school that serves preschool through 12th graders in Lakewood, Colorado. It was founded in 1916.

State Championships

Notable alumni
 Kirk Nieuwenhuis, Current MLB player (Milwaukee Brewers)

Controversy
Former high school guidance counselor Troy Vandenbroeke was charged and convicted in 2017 of sexually assaulting a student at this school from November 2010 through March 2015.

References

Christian schools in Colorado
High schools in Denver
Educational institutions established in 1951
Private high schools in Colorado
1951 establishments in Colorado